The Simla Bank Limited (1844) was a bank founded in the year 1844 in British India. The bank became defunct in the year 1893 with the winding down of its operations. The bank was notable for being the twenty ninth oldest bank in India.

History

Founding 

The Simla Bank Limited was founded in 1844 in Shimla, India.

The bank largely served the customers near the city of Shimla, which today corresponds to the Himachal Pradesh state of India.

Management 

The first Secretary of the bank was Dr. Carte. He was succeeded by Mr. Arnold H. Matthews, who continued attached to the Bank till 1854, when he was appointed Agent for the Agra United Service Bank at Agra.

The headquarters of this Bank are at Simla. It had branches at Ambala, Calcutta, Lahore, Mussoorie, Delhi, Agra, Bombay, and Madras.

Final years 

In 1892, the bank was on the verge of failure.

The bank was finally closed in the year 1893.

Legacy 

The bank is notable for being the twenty ninth oldest bank in India.

The bank played a key role in the history of Banking in India.

See also

Indian banking
List of banks in India

References

External links
 History of the bank by the Reserve Bank of India
 History of the Bank
 Economic History

Defunct banks of India
Companies based in Himachal Pradesh
Banks established in 1844